Little Beard or Si-gwa-ah-doh-gwih ("Spear Hanging Down") (died 1806), was a Seneca chief who participated in the American Revolutionary War on the side of Great Britain. After the war, he became reconciled  with the outcome and continued to reside in New York.

His village, Little Beard's Town was located near two other Seneca villages in modern Leicester in Livingston County,  New York, and consisted of about 130 houses. Little Beard participated in the Cherry Valley massacre of 1778, and presided over the torture and death of Boyd and Parker, captured scouts of the Sullivan Expedition of 1779. Subsequently, Little Beard's Town was destroyed by the American forces. Mary Jemison, then a resident of the village, fled with the natives to more secure villages. The modern town of Cuylerville was built at the spot.

Little Beard was one of the Seneca chiefs signing the Treaty of Canandaigua of 1794 that established some reservations for the Iroquois. He was also a signatory to the Treaty of Big Tree in 1797 that opened up Western New York for settlement. He died as the result of injuries received during a brawl at a tavern in 1806.

References 
"A History of the Treaty of Big Tree: and an Account of the Celebration...", by Livingston County Historical Society, O. Burnell Print, 1897

External links 
  Canandaigua Treaty of 1794

18th-century births
1806 deaths
Native American leaders
Native Americans in the American Revolution
Seneca people
People from Leicester, New York